The Timpahute Range is a mountain range in Lincoln County, Nevada, United States.

References 

Mountain ranges of Nevada
Mountain ranges of Lincoln County, Nevada